The Ontario New Democratic Youth (ONDY) is the youth wing of the Ontario New Democratic Party which is in turn affiliated with the federal New Democratic Party. Any party member, aged 25 or under is automatically a member of ONDY and is eligible to attend and vote in the youth wing's yearly convention, known as ONDYCON.

Structure 
ONDY members are grouped into clubs designated to represent one of 4 things: a riding, a school campus, a labour group, or a region. These clubs organize various events and act as the local chapters of ONDY. At the provincial level, ONDY is run by its executive, which are elected to one year terms by the Ontario New Democratic Youth's entire membership at its yearly convention. The executive must adhere to the rules of gender parity and is headed by two Co-Chairs.

Executive 
The 2019-2020 executive as elected at the 2019 ONDY Convention

Co-Chairs: Andre Fast, Sophie Geffros
Secretary-Treasurer: Bethany Drader
Communications Director: Riley Peterson
Policy Director: Curtis Fric
Equity Director: Riley McEntee
Outreach Director: Anyika Mark
Working Youth Coordinator: Chelsea Macdonald
Riding Youth & Resource Development Coordinator: Rory Ditchburn
Eastern Regional Organizer: Ryan Coyte
Central East Organizer: Ashley Noble
Metro Organizer: Amin Ali
North Organizer: Jake Raby
Central West Organizer: Maansi Gangotra
South West Organizer: Mason Cox

Influence 
The two co-chairs of ONDY are given a place on the Ontario New Democratic Party executive. In addition, ten members of the Ontario New Democratic Youth are chosen at the annual convention to attend provincial council on behalf of ONDY. Local youth clubs are also able to send two members to meetings of the Ontario New Democratic Party's provincial council.

References 

Ontario New Democratic Party
Youth wings of social democratic parties